Yongde County is a county in the west of Yunnan province, China. It is under the administration of the prefecture-level city of Lincang.

Administrative divisions
Yongde County has 3 towns, 5 townships and 2 ethnic townships. 
3 towns
 Dedang
 Xiaomengtong
 Yongkang
5 townships

2 ethnic townships
 Wumulong Yi (
 Daxueshan Yi Lahu and Dai (

Ethnic groups
The Yongde County Gazetteer (1994:115) lists the following ethnic groups.

Limi 利米 (Lami branch 腊米支系)
Luoren 倮人 (Gaisu branch 改苏支系)
Xiangtang 香堂 (Lalu branch 腊鲁支系)
Menghua Turen 蒙化土人 (Laluo branch 腊罗支系)
Samadu 撒马堵人 (Samo branch 洒摩支系)
Pengzi 棚子
Suan 蒜人

Climate

References

External links
Yongde County Official Site
Yongde County Agricultural Portal

County-level divisions of Lincang